A list of films produced by the Marathi language film industry based in Maharashtra in the year 2006.

January–March

April–June

July–September

October–December

Date unknown
A list of Marathi films released in 2006.

References

Lists of 2006 films by country or language
2006
2006 in Indian cinema